The Maharaja Agrasen Medical College, Agroha (MAMC) is a medical college in Agroha affiliated to Pt. B.D. Sharma University of Health Sciences, Rohtak and recognized by Medical Council of India. It is named after a legendary Indian king of Agroha in India Maharaj Agrasen. It is located at Agroha, Haryana, India . The college was founded by Om Prakash Jindal while his wife Savitri Jindal is the current president of the society that governs the institute.

Administrative body
This non-profit medical college and hospital are run by a non-profit society, Maharaja Agrasen Medical Education & Scientific Research Society. The Society was established at Agroha on 18 April 1988 to provide health care services, medical education and research facilities to more than 2 crore population living in Haryana and adjoining states of Rajasthan, Punjab and Himachal Pradesh and to fulfil the socialist ideals of Maharaja Agrasen Ji. Om Prakash Jindal was the founding president of the society, proceeded by Naveen Jindal and current president Savitri Jindal.

Elections 2021

In the governing body elections held on 19 February 2021, the following members were elected,

President: Savitri Jindal
Sr Vice President: Pawan Garg
Vice President: Jagdish Jindal
General Secretary: Jagdish Mittal 
Joint Secretary: RC Gupta
Treasurer: Manmohal Goel

Executive Members

Madan Lal Bansal
Navneet Goyal
Preetam Parkash Aggarwal
R.P Jindal
Ramesh Aggarwal
Romi Garg
Satyanand Arya
Saurabh Ajay Gupta
Sital Kumar Agarwal
Vivek Mittal

Courses offered
The college offers MBBS, GNM (General Nursing & Midwifery), B.Sc(Nursing),  BPT (Bachelor of Physiotherapy) and PG (post Graduate) courses.

The medical school offers the degrees of MBBS (medical school degree, equivalent to Doctor of Medicine or MD in some countries). It has attached schools offering degrees in nursing.

Admissions
Entry to this institute is highly competitive. The medical college entrance examination for MAMC is through NEET (National Eligibility -cum- Entrance Test) conducted by NTA, New Delhi on basis of merit list prepared by Pt. B. D. Sharma U. H. S. Rohtak. College also has 22 seats for the PG (Post Graduate) courses, admission for which are through AIPGMEE.

The college has Academic Facilities (Lecture room, Demo Rooms, Common Rooms, Labs, Library, Skill Lab, Computer Lab), Hospital, Residential Facilities (Staff Quarters, Hostel, Cafeteria, Hostel Mess), Indoor & Outdoor Recreation Facilities and
Medical Facilities for students & Staff.

Faculty
College has more than 90 teaching staff covering 20 different departments, namely Dentistry, Radiology, Obst. & Gynae, Anaesthesia, ENT, Ophthalmology, Orthopedics, General Surgery, General Medicine, Frensic Medicine, Psychiatry, Skin & VD, TB & Chest, Paediatrics, Microbiology, Pathology, Pharmacology, Biochemistry, Anatomy and Physiology, 82 Nursing & 168 non-teaching staff, and additional contractor and outsourced staff.

See also

 List of medical colleges in Haryana

References

Medical colleges in Haryana
Memorials to Agrasen
Educational institutions established in 1994
1994 establishments in Haryana
Education in Hisar district
Agroha (town)